Lev Shankovsky, (pseudonym - "Dzvin", "Oleh Martovych") was a Ukrainian military historian and former Ukrainian Insurgent Army (UPA) soldier, a leading member of the Organization of Ukrainian Nationalists. He was a full member of the Shevchenko Scientific Society.

Shankovsky was born in 1903 in the village of Duliby, Stryi Raion. He received military education in Ukrainian and Polish schools and served in the armies of the UPR and the UGA. Participants of the First Winter Campaign (1920). During the Second World War he participated in the Resistance in the Ukrainian Insurgent Army.

In January 1944, Shankovsky, as a leader of the UPA forces, headed the initiating commission that established contacts with representatives of former Ukrainian political parties as well as nonpartisan activists. Shankovsky, for example, asserted at a round-table discussion that organized anti-Semitism "never existed" in Ukraine.

Author publications: "Ukrainian Liberation Movement in Modern Times" (1951), "UPA and its clandestine literature" (1952), "The original group of OUN" (1958), "Ukrainian Insurgent Army in the struggle for statehood" (1958), "Ukrainian Galician Army" (1974).

Shankovsky died on 25 April 1995, aged 91, in Philadelphia, Pennsylvania and was interred in the Ukrainian Orthodox Cemetery in South Bound Brook, New Jersey.

References

External links
Internet Encyclopedia of Ukraine, Ukrainian Supreme Liberation Council
Оброшинська ЗОШ ім.Л.Шанковського І-ІІІ ст., Лев Шанковський 

Organization of Ukrainian Nationalists politicians
Ukrainian Austro-Hungarians
People from the Kingdom of Galicia and Lodomeria
Ukrainian Insurgent Army
Ukrainian nationalists
People from Lviv Oblast
1903 births
1995 deaths
Polish emigrants to the United States